The KUR EC2 class, later known as the EAR 52 class, was a class of  gauge  Garratt-type articulated steam locomotives operated by the Kenya-Uganda Railway (KUR) and the East African Railways (EAR).

Production
The ten members of the class were ordered by the KUR.  Unusually, they were built by North British Locomotive Company in Glasgow, Scotland, instead of Beyer, Peacock & Co., the builder of all the KUR's other Garratt locomotives.

Service history
The whole class entered service in 1931, and its members were later operated by the KUR's successor, the EAR, both in Kenya/Uganda and in Tanzania.

Class list
The numbers, build dates and names of each member of the class were as follows:

See also
History of rail transport in Tanzania
Rail transport in Kenya
Rail transport in Uganda

References

Notes

Bibliography

External links

East African Railways locomotives
Garratt locomotives
Kenya-Uganda Railway locomotives
Metre gauge steam locomotives
NBL locomotives
Railway locomotives introduced in 1931
Steam locomotives of Kenya
Steam locomotives of Tanzania
Steam locomotives of Uganda
4-8-2+2-8-4 locomotives
Scrapped locomotives